Gallico is a surname. Notable people with the surname include:

 Elisha Gallico (died  1583), Palestinian Jewish Talmudist
 Paul Gallico (1897–1976), American novelist

See also
 Gallica (disambiguation)